The M21 road is a long metropolitan route in the City of Tshwane in Gauteng, South Africa. It connects Ga-Rankuwa with Hammanskraal via Mabopane and Soshanguve.

Route 
The M21 route begins at a junction with the R513 Route (Brits Road) near De Wildt, North West. It heads northwards to cross the N4 Highway (Platinum Highway; westbound only) just east of the N4's Brits Toll Plaza. It continues north to meet the R566 Route and enter the township of Ga-Rankuwa as Kware Street.

It heads north-north-east through the centre of Ga-Rankuwa to pass through Hebron before passing through Mabopane. In the suburb of Winterveld, the M21 bends to the east-north-east and meets the M39 route before passing through the northern part of Soshanguve, where it meets the M35 route.

After Soshanguve, the M21 turns northwards, then eastwards at the Mogogelo Road junction, to reach the township of Hammanskraal, where it makes a right turn and becomes Herry Gwala Avenue before crossing the Apies River and reaching its end at a junction with the R101 Route (Old Warmbaths Road).

References 

Metropolitan Routes in Pretoria